Lars Jansson may refer to:
Lars Jansson (cartoonist) (1926–2000), Finnish author and cartoonist
Lars Jansson (composer) (born 1951), jazz pianist and composer